Suzanne Svensson (born 1958) is a Swedish politician. She served as member of the Riksdag from 4 October 2010 to 24 September 2018, representing the constituency of Blekinge County.

References 

Living people
1958 births
Place of birth missing (living people)
21st-century Swedish politicians
21st-century Swedish women politicians
Members of the Riksdag 2014–2018
Members of the Riksdag 2018–2022
Members of the Riksdag from the Social Democrats
Women members of the Riksdag